Drawbar may refer to:
Drawbar (defense), a defensive implement used to secure a door or gate in a medieval building
Drawbar (haulage), a device for coupling a hauling vehicle to a load
Drawbar (machine tool), a device for securing tools e.g. in milling machines
A slider control on a Hammond organ used for changing the timbre and sound of the instrument
 "Drawbar", a song by Linkin Park featuring Tom Morello from The Hunting Party